The United Nations Educational, Scientific and Cultural Organization (UNESCO) World Heritage Sites are places of importance to cultural or natural heritage as described in the UNESCO World Heritage Convention, established in 1972. Cultural heritage consists of monuments (such as architectural works, monumental sculptures, or inscriptions), groups of buildings, and sites (including archaeological sites). Natural features (consisting of physical and biological formations), geological and physiographical formations (including habitats of threatened species of animals and plants), and natural sites which are important from the point of view of science, conservation or natural beauty, are defined as natural heritage.  Belarus accepted the convention on 12 October 1988, making its natural and historical sites eligible for inclusion on the list.

, there are four World Heritage Sites in Belarus. The first site added to the list was the Białowieża Forest in 1992, representing an extension to the site previously listed in Poland in 1979. This is the only natural site in Belarus, the other three are cultural. In addition to Białowieża Forest, the Struve Geodetic Arc is also a transnational site, and is shared with nine other countries. , Belarus has five sites listed on the tentative list; all were added in 2004.



World Heritage Sites 
UNESCO lists sites under ten criteria; each entry must meet at least one of the criteria. Criteria i through vi are cultural, and vii through x are natural.

Tentative list
In addition to sites inscribed on the World Heritage List, member states can maintain a list of tentative sites that they may consider for nomination. Nominations for the World Heritage List are only accepted if the site was previously listed on the tentative list. As of 2020, Belarus lists five properties on its tentative list.

References 

Belarusian culture
World Heritage Sites
Belarus
 List
World Heritage Sites